The 2013 USA Pro Cycling Challenge is the third edition of the USA Pro Cycling Challenge stage race. Once again, the race was included on the UCI America Tour, with a UCI classification of 2.HC. As such, the race was only open to teams on the UCI Pro Tour, UCI Professional Continental and UCI Continental circuits.  The race took place between August 19–25, 2013 as a seven-day, seven-stage race, traversing the state of Colorado. The 2013 USA Pro Cycling Challenge was one of six UCI-ranked stage races in the United States in 2013, and one of two (along with the 2013 Tour of California) that attracted multiple UCI ProTeams to compete.

American Tejay van Garderen of  won the overall title after finishing lower on the podium the previous two years.

Participating teams
In July, the USA Pro Cycling Challenge announced a sixteen-team field, made up of seven UCI ProTeams (up from six), four UCI Professional Continental Teams (down from six) and five UCI Continental Teams (up from four), thus giving the race a total of sixteen-teams (steady from 2012). The remaining nine teams are based in the United States.

UCI ProTeams
  
  *
  *
  *
  *
 
 

UCI Professional Continental Teams
 
 
  *
  *

(* – participated in 2012)

UCI Continental Teams
 
  *
 
 
  *

Contenders

Defending champion, American Christian Vande Velde of  hoped to defend his title. 's Lachlan Morton of Australia, and 's Mathias Frank of Switzerland were both considered potential dark horses.

Stages

Stage 1
August 19, 2013 — Aspen to Snowmass, 

Stage 2
August 20, 2013 — Aspen to Breckenridge,

Stage 3
August 21, 2013 — Breckenridge to Steamboat Springs,

Stage 4

August 22, 2013 — Steamboat Springs to Beaver Creek,

Stage 5
August 23, 2013 — Vail to Vail,

Stage 6
August 24, 2013 — Loveland to Fort Collins,

Stage 7
August 25, 2013 — Denver to Denver,

Classification leadership

In the 2013 USA Pro Cycling Challenge, five jerseys are awarded. For the general classification, calculated by adding the finishing times of the stages per cyclist, the leader receives a yellow jersey. This classification is considered the most important of the USA Pro Cycling Challenge, and the winner of the general classification will be considered the winner of the event.

Additionally, there is also a sprints classification, akin to what is called the points classification in other races, which awards a green jersey. Points are gathered at sprint line performances as well as finishing the stage in the top-fifteen places.

There is also a mountains classification, which awards a red jersey. In the mountains classifications, points are won by reaching the top of a mountain before other cyclists. Each climb is categorized, either first, second, third, or fourth category, with more points available for the harder climbs.

There is also a youth classification. This classification is calculated the same way as the general classification, but only young cyclists (under 23) are included. The leader of the young rider classification receives a white jersey.

The last jersey is awarded to the most aggressive rider of a stage for him to wear on the next stage. It is generally awarded to a rider who attacks constantly or spends a lot of time in the breakaways. This jersey is orange.

There is also a classification for teams. In this classification, the times of the best three cyclists per stage are added, and the team with the lowest time is the leader.

Classification standings

General classification

Points classification

King of the Mountains classification

Young Riders classification

Team classification

References

External links

USA Pro Cycling Challenge
USA Pro Cycling Challenge
USA Pro Cycling Challenge
USA Pro Cycling